Daniel Gharabaghi Stückler  (born 13 April 1997) is a Danish professional footballer who plays for Ishøj IF. He has represented Denmark at several youth levels.

Career

Brøndby IF
On 31 January 2014, Stückler signed a three-year contract with Brøndby IF which tied him to the club until the end of 2016, with a €100,000 transfer being paid to Lyngby BK.

He made his debut (in jersey number 34) at the age of 17 years and 14 days as the youngest player ever in the club history and also became the first player born in 1997 to make a league debut.  Magnus Warming later became the youngest debutante for Brøndby IF during 2017.

In the 2014–15 season Stückler played for Brøndby IF's U19-team which finished sixth in the table after 22 matches while he scored 12 goals which placed him third on the list of top-scorers.

Daniel was officially promoted to the first team during the winter break. On 9 December 2016, Brøndby announced that Stückler would leave the club at the end of the year.

HB Køge
On 30 December 2016, it was announced that Stückler had signed a contract with HB Køge and would join the club in January 2017. He left the club again in summer 2017.

FC Helsingør
On 28 July 2017, Stückler signed a contract with Danish Superliga side FC Helsingør. He made his debut on 29 September 2017 as a second-half substitute in a 5–1 loss against AGF.

Lyngby BK 
On 9 July 2018, Stückler signed a contract with Danish First Division club Lyngby BK. He left the club at the end of the season.

B.93
On 22 July 2019 B.93 announced, that Stückler had joined the club. Stückler left B.93 again at the end of the 2020-21 season.

Ishøj
On 2 August 2021, Stückler joined Ishøj IF.

International career 
Stückler represented Denmark at various youth levels from 2012 to 2016. Although born in Denmark, Stückler is eligible to represent Iran and Austria through his parents and stated that he would consider a call-up from the Iranian national football team.

Career statistics

(—) Not qualified

References

External links
 
 Daniel Stückler DBU-statistics

1997 births
Living people
Association football forwards
Danish men's footballers
Iranian footballers
Denmark youth international footballers
Danish Superliga players
Danish 1st Division players
Danish people of Iranian descent
Danish people of Austrian descent
Austrian people of Iranian descent
Brøndby IF players
HB Køge players
FC Helsingør players
Lyngby Boldklub players
Boldklubben af 1893 players
Ishøj IF players
Place of birth missing (living people)
Sportspeople of Iranian descent